Eucharassus is a genus of beetles in the family Cerambycidae, containing the following species:

 Eucharassus bicolor Melzer, 1934
 Eucharassus chemsaki Monne, 2007
 Eucharassus confusus Galileo & Martins, 2001
 Eucharassus dispar Bates, 1885
 Eucharassus flavotibiale Galileo & Martins, 2001
 Eucharassus hovorei Monne, 2007
 Eucharassus lingafelteri Monne, 2007
 Eucharassus nevermanni Melzer, 1934
 Eucharassus nigratus Martins & Galileo, 2009
 Eucharassus nisseri Aurivillius, 1891
 Eucharassus wappesi Monne, 2007

References

Necydalopsini